The 1963 Railway Cup Hurling Championship was the 37th staging of the Railway Cup since its establishment by the Gaelic Athletic Association in 1927. The cup began on 24 February 1963 and ended on 14 April 1963.

Leinster were the defending champions.

On 14 April 1963, Munster won the championship following a 2-08 to 2-07 defeat of Leinster in the final. This was their 27th Railway Cup title and their first since 1961.

Munster's Jimmy Doyle was the Railway Cup top scorer with 4-09.

Results

Semi-finals

Finals

Cup statistics

Scoring

Top scorers overall

Top scorers in a single game

Miscellaneous

 Christy Ring claimed his 18th winners' medal after making his 23rd consecutive appearance in the Railway Cup Championship.

Bibliography

 Donegan, Des, The Complete Handbook of Gaelic Games (DBA Publications Limited, 2005).

References

Railway Cup Hurling Championship
1963 in hurling